Sukheke Mandi is a town near Pindi Bhattian in Hafizabad District and Gujranwala Division in Punjab, Pakistan. It is located on the Sargodha Lahore road having a population of around about 50,000.

Geography
 Latitude of Sukheke Mandi: 31.883333 (31° 53′ 0″ N)
 Longitude: 73.466667 (73° 28′ 0″ E)
 Altitude: 207 m
 Population 2017: (50000)(city population)

Connection with the city is by  Sargodha Lahore road. On the Wazirabad – Faisalabad Railway Section, Sukheke Mandi is a railway station. Basically, it is an agricultural city. Since the construction of an interchange near Sukheke Mandi, Hafizabad is now just 5 kilometers away from the M2 motorway.

Climate

The town is hot during summer and during winter is cold. The Eastern has proximity of rain fall than the western part. The monsoon season is from July to September. Fertile soil allows the cultivation of rices. The average per month rainfall is between 50 and 75 millimeters.

Schools and colleges
  Govt High School
  Govt Rashid Minhas Degree College For Boys Sukeke Mandi
  Govt Girls Higher Secondary School
  Govt Girls Degree College Sukheke Mandi
 Al-Karam Public School Sukheki Mandi
  Grammar Model School
  Paradise Modal School
  Pakiza Public High School
  Darul Ehsan Public school
  The Role Model School
  Sitara Memorial Middle School
 Rehan Science school and college Sukheke mandi
Starlight public school Sukheke mandi
 Grammar High School Sukheke Mandi
 Concept School system sukheki mandi

Populated places in Hafizabad District